Magda Paveleková (7 June 1931 – 20 July 2015) was a Slovak actress. She acted mainly on the stage, performing with the Slovak National Theatre for more than 40 years. She also played parts in 12 films. Paveleková won the Hall of Fame OTO Award for 2012. She won the  prize in 2007.

References

External links

1931 births
2015 deaths
Slovak stage actresses
Slovak film actresses
Slovak television actresses
People from Levice
20th-century Slovak actresses
21st-century Slovak actresses